The Sand Hollow Wash Bridge near Littlefield, Arizona, United States, is a historic Warren deck truss bridge built in 1929.  It brought the old U.S. Route 91 (US 91) over Sand Hollow Wash. It was listed on the National Register of Historic Places in 1988.

See also 
 
 
 
 
 List of bridges on the National Register of Historic Places in Arizona
 National Register of Historic Places listings in Mohave County, Arizona

References 

Road bridges on the National Register of Historic Places in Arizona
Bridges of the United States Numbered Highway System
Infrastructure completed in 1929
Buildings and structures in Mohave County, Arizona
U.S. Route 91
National Register of Historic Places in Mohave County, Arizona
Warren truss bridges in the United States